Stan Zimmerman is an American television producer, director and screenwriter. Zimmerman has written for many television series including The Golden Girls, Roseanne and Gilmore Girls and the 1996 feature film A Very Brady Sequel. Zimmerman is also the creator and executive producer of the sitcom Rita Rocks.

Career 

Zimmerman directed the music video for the pop band Whore's Mascara's song "All I Want". The song was nominated for 3 Pill Awards, including Best Video and Best Director, and had a cameo appearance by Laverne Cox. Other television writing credits include Brothers, Just Our Luck, George Burns Comedy Week, Hooperman, Something Wilder, Secs & EXECS, Fame, and Wanda at Large.

In theater, Zimmerman directed "Gemini" (Celebration Theatre), "Spike Heels" (Actors Circle Theatre), "A Tuna Christmas" (Theater Asylum), "Entertaining Mr Sloane" (The Actors Company Theatre), "Blink & You Might Miss Me" (Theatre Asylum), "Daughter Of" (3 Clubs Lounge), "Warm Cheese" (Studio C), "Synthesis" (Dorie Theatre), "Pledge" (McCadden Place Theatre), "Pinata" (Lounge Theatre). He directed and co-wrote, in collaboration with Christian McLaughlin, the critical acclaimed "Meet & Greet" (Elephant Space), "Yes, Virginia" (Studio C) and the workshop productions of "It's On!", the TV theme song musical (Falcon Theatre, NYMF). He conceived and directed "Suicide Notes: In Their Own Words" (Theatre Asylum).

Stan also appeared on Bravo's Situation: Comedy reality show, as TV host/showrunner. The show is produced by Sean Hayes. Together with Berg, he also wrote the first The Brady Bunch Movie, though not credited, and rewrote the TV movie Annie for American Broadcasting Company.

Filmography

Film 

 A Very Brady Sequel (1996, feature film)
 Christmas Bounty (2013)

Television 

 Brothers
 Fame
 Gilmore Girls
 George Burns Comedy Week
 The Golden Girls
 Hooperman
 Just Our Luck
 Pauly

 Roseanne
 Rita Rocks
 Something Wilder
 Secs & EXECS (2017)
 Skirtchasers (2016)
 Wanda at Large
 Brunch Date (2021)

Awards and recognition 

Stan Zimmerman and his associate James Berg have received two Writers Guild of America nominations, one for The Golden Girls, "Rose's Mother" and the other for the lesbian kiss episode of Roseanne, "Don't Ask, Don't Tell".

He also received several awards for his work in theatre, such as "Best Director" for "Blink & You Might Miss Me" by BroadwayWorld.com, Hollywood Fringe Encore Producers' Award and 3 StageSceneLA Awards, including Best Director for "Meet & Greet", 3 StageSceneLA Awards, including Best Director for "Spike Heels", 7 StageSceneLA Awards, including Best Director for "Entertaining Mr Sloane", and Hollywood Fringe Encore Producers' Award for "Suicide Notes".

Private life 

Stan Zimmerman is openly gay, as is his business associate James Berg. He is Jewish.

References

External links 

Living people
American male screenwriters
American television producers
American television writers
American LGBT screenwriters
LGBT television producers
American male television writers
Place of birth missing (living people)
Year of birth missing (living people)
LGBT Jews
Jewish American writers